The International Glaciological Society (IGS) was founded in 1936 to provide a focus for individuals interested in glaciology, practical and scientific aspects of snow and ice. It was originally known as the "Association for the Study of Snow and Ice". The name was changed to the "British Glaciological Society" in 1945. With more and more non-British glaciologists attending its readings and submitting papers for publication, the name was changed to the "Glaciological Society" in 1962 and finally the Society acquired its present name in 1971. The IGS publishes the Journal of Glaciology, Annals of Glaciology and ICE, the news bulletin of the IGS; the Journal of Glaciology won the ALPSP/Charlesworth Award for the "Best Learned Journal of 2007".

Branches 

The Society has branches in different parts of the world, providing a further opportunity for those sharing a common interest to meet and exchange information:

 British Branch (United Kingdom)
 Nordic branch
 Northeastern North American Branch
 Polish Branch
 Western Alpine branch
 New Zealand branch

Awards

The Seligman Crystal 
The Society honours glaciologists who have contributed significantly to the science of glaciology. At a Council meeting in Obergurgl, Austria in late 1962, the concept of an award for excellence in the discipline of glaciology took shape: not a gold medal but a hexagonal crystal of high-quality glass named the Seligman Crystal, after the Society's founder, Gerald Seligman. It is awarded 'from time to time to one who has made an outstanding scientific contribution to glaciology so that the subject is now enriched.'

The Richardson Medal 
The Richardson Medal was created in 1993 to mark the retirement of the Secretary General, Mrs Hilda Richardson. This award recognises outstanding contributions to the Society and to glaciology, and is normally awarded to members. Awardees include:

 1993 - Hilda Richardson
 1997 - D R MacAyeal
 1998 - G K C Clarke
 2000 - J A Heap
 2003 - C S L Ommanney
 2010 - T H Jacka
 2012 - W S B (Stan) Paterson
 2013 - J W Glen and A Weidick
 2016 - E M Morris and T Chinn
 2017 - J M Palais
 2018 - J Oerlemans
 2020 - Christina Hulbe and Eric Wolff

Honorary Membership 
Honorary Membership is the oldest of the Society's awards. It was first officially recorded in the 1962 Constitution, when the name of the Society changed from “the British Glaciological Society” to “the Glaciological Society”. (Prior to that date, a few eminent persons had been made Honorary Members on an informal and ad hoc basis.).  There shall not exceed twelve in number.

The following are Honorary Members:
 G K C Clarke
 J W Glen
 V M Kotlyakov
 G Østrem
 G Wakahama
 Yang Zhenniang
 K Higuchi
See also
 Ukichiro Nakaya

See also 
International Association of Cryospheric Sciences

References

External links 
 International Glaciological Society

British Antarctic Survey
Earth sciences societies
Geographic societies
Glaciology
International learned societies
Organisations based in Cambridge
Science and technology in Cambridgeshire